William Claude Dukenfield (January 29, 1880 – December 25, 1946), better known as W. C. Fields, was an American comedian, actor, juggler, and writer. Fields's comic persona was a misanthropic and hard-drinking egotist who remained a sympathetic character despite his supposed contempt for children and dogs.

Overview
Fields's career in show business began in vaudeville, where he attained international success as a silent juggler. He began to incorporate comedy into his act and was a featured comedian in the Ziegfeld Follies for several years. He became a star in the Broadway musical comedy Poppy (1923), in which he played a colorful small-time con man. His subsequent stage and film roles were often similar scoundrels or henpecked everyman characters.

Among his trademarks were his raspy drawl and grandiloquent vocabulary. His film and radio persona was generally identified with Fields himself. It was maintained by the publicity departments at Fields's studios (Paramount and Universal) and was further established by Robert Lewis Taylor's biography W. C. Fields, His Follies and Fortunes (1949). Beginning in 1973, with the publication of Fields's letters, photos, and personal notes in grandson Ronald Fields's book W. C. Fields by Himself, it was shown that Fields was married (and subsequently estranged from his wife), financially supported their son, and loved his grandchildren.

Early years
Fields was born William Claude Dukenfield in Darby, Pennsylvania, the oldest child of a working-class family. His father, James Lydon Dukenfield (1841–1913), was from an English family that emigrated from Sheffield, Yorkshire, England, in 1854. James Dukenfield served in Company M of the 72nd Pennsylvania Infantry Regiment in the American Civil War and was wounded in 1863. Fields's mother, Kate Spangler Felton (1854–1925), was a Protestant of British ancestry. The 1876 Philadelphia City Directory  lists James Dukenfield as a clerk. After marrying, he worked as an independent produce merchant and a part-time hotel-keeper.

Claude Dukenfield (as he was known) had a volatile relationship with his short-tempered father. He ran away from home repeatedly, beginning at the age of nine, often to stay with his grandmother or an uncle. His education was sporadic and did not progress beyond grade school. At age twelve he worked with his father, selling produce from a wagon, until the two had a fight that resulted in Fields running away once again. In 1893, he worked briefly at the Strawbridge and Clothier department store, and in an oyster house.

Fields later embellished stories of his childhood, depicting himself as a runaway who lived by his wits on the streets of Philadelphia from an early age, but his home life is believed to have been reasonably happy. He had already discovered in himself a facility for juggling, and a performance he witnessed at a local theater inspired him to dedicate substantial time to perfecting his juggling. At age 17, he was living with his family and performing a juggling act at church and theater shows.

In 1904 Fields's father visited him for two months in England while he was performing there in music halls. Fields enabled his father to retire, purchased him a summer home, and encouraged his parents and siblings to learn to read and write so they could communicate with him by letter.

Entry into vaudeville
Inspired by the success of the "Original Tramp Juggler", James Edward Harrigan, Fields adopted a similar costume of scruffy beard and shabby tuxedo and entered vaudeville as a genteel "tramp juggler" in 1898, using the name W. C. Fields. His family supported his ambitions for the stage and saw him off on the train for his first stage tour. To conceal a stutter, Fields did not speak onstage. In 1900, seeking to distinguish himself from the many "tramp" acts in vaudeville, he changed his costume and makeup and began touring as "The Eccentric Juggler". He manipulated cigar boxes, hats, and other objects in his act, parts of which are reproduced in some of his films, notably in the 1934 comedy The Old Fashioned Way.

By the early 1900s, while touring, he was regularly called the world's greatest juggler. He became a headliner in North America and Europe and toured Australia and South Africa in 1903. When Fields played for English-speaking audiences, he found he could get more laughs by adding muttered patter and sarcastic asides to his routines. According to W. Buchanan-Taylor, a performer who saw Fields's performance in an English music hall, Fields would "reprimand a particular ball which had not come to his hand accurately" and "mutter weird and unintelligible expletives to his cigar when it missed his mouth".

Broadway

In 1905 Fields made his Broadway debut in a musical comedy, The Ham Tree. His role in the show required him to deliver lines of dialogue, which he had never before done onstage.  He later said, "I wanted to become a real comedian, and there I was, ticketed and pigeonholed as merely a comedy juggler." In 1913 he performed on a bill with Sarah Bernhardt (who regarded Fields as "an artiste [who] could not fail to please the best class of audience"), first at the New York Palace and then in England in a royal performance for George V and Queen Mary.  He continued touring in vaudeville until 1915.

Beginning in 1915, he appeared on Broadway in Florenz Ziegfeld's Ziegfeld Follies revue, delighting audiences with a wild billiards skit complete with bizarrely shaped cues and a custom-built table used for a number of hilarious gags and surprising trick shots. His pool game is reproduced in part in some of his films, notably in Six of a Kind in 1934. The act was a success, and Fields starred in the Follies from 1916 to 1922, not as a juggler but as a comedian in ensemble sketches.  In addition to many editions of the Follies, Fields starred in the 1923 Broadway musical comedy Poppy, wherein he perfected his persona as a colorful small-time con man. In 1928, he appeared in The Earl Carroll Vanities.

His stage costume from 1915 onward featured a top hat, cut-away coat and collar, and a cane. The costume had a remarkable similarity to that of the comic strip character Ally Sloper, who may have been the inspiration for Fields's costume, according to Roger Sabin. The Sloper character may in turn have been inspired by Dickens's Mr Micawber, whom Fields later played on film.

Films

Silent era and first talkies
In 1915, Fields starred in two short comedies, Pool Sharks and His Lordship's Dilemma, filmed at the French Gaumont Company's American studio in Flushing, New York. His stage commitments prevented him from doing more movie work until 1924, when he played a supporting role in Janice Meredith, a Revolutionary War romance starring Marion Davies. He reprised his Poppy role in a silent-film adaptation, retitled Sally of the Sawdust (1925), directed by D. W. Griffith for Paramount Pictures. On the basis of his work in that film and Griffith's subsequent production That Royle Girl, Paramount offered Fields a contract to star in his own series of feature-length comedies.  His next starring role was in It's the Old Army Game (1926), which featured his friend Louise Brooks, later a screen legend for her role in G. W. Pabst's Pandora's Box (1929) in Germany. Fields's 1926 film, which included a silent version of the porch sequence that would later be expanded in the sound film It's a Gift (1934), had only middling success at the box office. The following three films Fields made at Astoria, however—So's Your Old Man (1926, remade as You're Telling Me! in 1934), The Potters (1927), and Running Wild (1927—were successes on an increasing scale and gained Fields a growing following as a silent comedian. Running Wild was the most successful of these, with a final cost of $179,000 and bringing in domestic rentals of $328,000 and another $92,000 from overseas. Rivalry between Paramount studio executives B. P. Schulberg on the West Coast and William Le Baron on the East Coast led to the closure of the New York studio and the centralization of Paramount production in Hollywood. Running Wild was the last silent film Paramount made at Astoria. When the filming was completed on April 28, the remaining handful of personnel left on the lot were let go with two weeks' severance pay, and the studio went idle. Fields went immediately to Hollywood, where Schulberg teamed him with Chester Conklin for two features and loaned him and Conklin out for an Al Christie-produced remake of Tillie's Punctured Romance for Paramount release. All of these were commercial failures and are now lost.

Fields wore a scruffy clip-on mustache in all of his silent films. According to film historian William K. Everson, he perversely insisted on wearing the conspicuously fake-looking mustache because he knew it was disliked by audiences.  Fields wore it in his first sound film, The Golf Specialist (1930)—a two-reeler that faithfully reproduces a sketch he had introduced in 1918 in the Follies—but gave up wearing a mustache after his first sound feature film, Her Majesty, Love (1931), his only Warner Bros. production and the only time he wore a more realistic mustache for a role.

At Paramount
In the sound era, Fields appeared in thirteen feature films for Paramount Pictures, beginning with Million Dollar Legs in 1932. In that year he also was featured in a sequence in the anthology film If I Had a Million. In 1932 and 1933, Fields made four short subjects, distributed through Paramount Pictures, for comedy pioneer Mack Sennett. These shorts, adapted with few alterations from Fields's stage routines and written entirely by himself, were described by Simon Louvish as "the 'essence' of Fields". The first of them, The Dentist, is unusual in that Fields portrays an entirely unsympathetic character: he cheats at golf, assaults his caddy, and treats his patients with unbridled callousness. William K. Everson says that the cruelty of this comedy made it "hardly less funny" but that "Fields must have known that The Dentist presented a serious flaw for a comedy image that was intended to endure", and Fields showed a somewhat warmer persona in his subsequent Sennett shorts. Nevertheless, the popular success of his next release, International House, established him as a major star. A shaky outtake from the production, allegedly the only film record of that year's Long Beach earthquake, was later revealed to have been faked as a publicity stunt for the movie.

Fields's 1934 classic It's a Gift includes another one of his earlier stage sketches, one in which he endeavors to escape his nagging family by sleeping on the back porch, where he is bedeviled by noisy neighbors and salesmen. That film, like You're Telling Me! and Man on the Flying Trapeze, ended happily with a windfall profit that restored his standing in his screen families. With those screen successes, Fields in 1935 was able to achieve a career ambition by playing the character Mr. Micawber in MGM's David Copperfield. 

The strain of all this activity exacted a terrible physical toll on Fields's health. He fell ill with influenza and back trouble requiring round-the-clock nursing in late June 1935 and then was emotionally shattered by the sudden deaths of two of his closest friends, Will Rogers on August 15 and Sam Hardy on October 16. The combination of these events provoked a complete breakdown for Fields that laid him up for nine months. He was gingerly approached the next year to recreate his signature stage role in Poppy for Paramount Pictures; he accepted but was very weak throughout the production and a double was often used in long shots. After filming was complete, he relapsed when he learned another close friend and screen partner, Tammany Young, had died in his sleep on April 26 at age 49. Losing three friends in less than a year sent Fields into a deep depression, plus he stopped eating, his back pain flared up, and his chronic lung congestion trouble returned with a vengeance, eventually turning into pneumonia. He would be in hospitals and sanitariums for various treatments until the summer of 1937.

In September 1937 Fields returned to Hollywood to "star" in Paramount's complicated musical variety anthology The Big Broadcast of 1938, appearing with Martha Raye, Dorothy Lamour, and Bob Hope. In an unusual twist, Fields plays the roles of two nearly identical brothers (T. Frothingill Bellows and S. B. Bellow), collaborating with several noted international musicians of the time, including Kirsten Flagstad (Norwegian opera soprano), Wilfred Pelletier (Canadian conductor of New York's Metropolitan Opera Orchestra), Tito Guizar (Mexican vocalist), Shep Fields (conducting his Rippling Rhythm Jazz Orchestra), and John Serry Sr. (Italian-American orchestral accordionist). The film received critical acclaim and earned an Oscar in 1939 for best music in an original song (Thanks for the Memory). Fields, however, loathed working on the film and particularly detested the director, Mitchell Leisen, who felt the same way about Fields and thought him unfunny and difficult. ("He was the most obstinate, ornery son of a bitch I ever tried to work with" was Leisen's opinion.) The arguments between Fields and Leisen were so constant and intense during the five-month shoot that when the production concluded on November 15, 1937, Leisen went home and had a heart attack.

Fields versus "Nibblers"
Fields in the early years of his film career became highly protective of his intellectual properties that formed his acts and defined his on-screen persona. In burlesque, vaudeville, and the rapidly expanding motion picture industry, many of his fellow performers and comedy writers often copied or "borrowed" sketches or portions of routines developed and presented by others. Not surprisingly, as Fields's popularity with audiences continued to rise after 1915, following his initial work in films, other entertainers started to adopt and integrate parts of his successful acts into their own performances. Fields in 1918 began to combat the thievery by registering his sketches and other comedy material with the Copyright Office of the Library of Congress in Washington, D.C. Nevertheless, the pilfering continued and became so frequent by 1919 that he felt "compelled" to place a prominent warning that year in the June 13 issue of Variety, the most widely read trade paper at the time. Addressed to "Nibblers", more specifically to "indiscreet burlesque and picture players", Fields's notice occupies nearly half a page in Variety. In it, he cautions fellow performers that all of his "acts (and businesses therein) are protected by United States and International copyright", stressing that he and his attorneys in New York and Chicago will "vigorously prosecute all offenders in the future". The concluding "W. C. Fields" was printed in such large letters that it dominated the two-page spread in the paper.

Fields continued personally and with legal counsel to protect his comedy material during the final decades of his career, especially with regard to that material's reuse in his films. For example, he copyrighted his original stage sketch "An Episode at the Dentist's" three times: in January 1919 and twice again in 1928, in July and August. Later, 13 years after its first copyright registration, that same sketch continued to serve Fields as a framework for developing his already noted short The Dentist. He also copyrighted his 1928 sketch "Stolen Bonds", which in 1933 was translated into scenes for his two-reel "black comedy" The Fatal Glass of Beer. Other examples of Fields's stage-to-film use of his copyrighted material is the previously discussed 1918 Follies sketch "An Episode on the Links" and its recycling in both his 1930 short The Golf Specialist and in his feature You're Telling Me! in 1934. "The Sleeping Porch" sketch that reappears as an extended segment in It's a Gift was copyrighted as well by Fields in 1928. A few more of his copyrighted creations include "An Episode of Lawn Tennis" (1918), "The Mountain Sweep Steaks" (1919), "The Pullman Sleeper" (1921), "Ten Thousand People Killed" (1925), and "The Midget Car" (1930). The total number of sketches created by Fields over the years, both copyrighted and uncopyrighted, remains undetermined. The number, however, may exceed 100. Of that body of work, Fields between 1918 and 1930 applied for and received 20 copyrights covering 16 of his most important sketches, the ones that Fields biographer Simon Louvish has described as the "bedrock" upon which the legendary comedian built his stage career and then prolonged that success through his films.

Personal life

Fields married a fellow vaudevillian, chorus girl Harriet "Hattie" Hughes (1879–1963), on April 8, 1900. She became part of Fields's stage act, appearing as his assistant, whom he would blame entertainingly when he missed a trick.  Hattie was educated and she tutored Fields in reading and writing during their travels. Under her influence, he became an enthusiastic reader and traveled with a trunk of books, including grammar texts, translations of Homer and Ovid, and works by authors ranging from Shakespeare to Dickens to Twain and P. G. Wodehouse.

The couple had a son, William Claude Fields, Jr. (1904–1971) and although Fields was an atheist—who, according to James Curtis, "regarded all religions with the suspicion of a seasoned con man"—he yielded to Hattie's wish to have their son baptized.

By 1907, he and Hattie had separated; she had been pressing him to stop touring and settle into a respectable trade, but he was unwilling to give up show business. They never divorced. Until his death, Fields continued to correspond with Hattie (mostly through letters) and voluntarily sent her a weekly stipend. Their correspondence would at times be tense. Fields accused Hattie of turning their son against him and of demanding more money from him than he could afford.

While performing in New York City at the New Amsterdam Theater in 1916, Fields met Bessie Poole, an established Ziegfeld Follies performer whose beauty and quick wit attracted him, and they began a relationship. With her he had another son, named William Rexford Fields Morris (1917–2014). Neither Fields nor Poole wanted to abandon touring to raise the child, who was placed in foster care with a childless couple of Bessie's acquaintance. Fields's relationship with Poole lasted until 1926. In 1927, he made a negotiated payment to her of $20,000 upon her signing an affidavit declaring that "W. C. Fields is NOT the father of my child". Poole died of complications of alcoholism in October 1928, and Fields contributed to their son's support until he was 19 years of age.

Fields met Carlotta Monti (1907–1993) in 1933, and the two began a sporadic relationship that lasted until his death in 1946. Monti had small roles in two of Fields's films and in 1971 wrote a memoir, W. C. Fields and Me, which was made into a motion picture at Universal Studios in 1976. Fields was listed in the 1940 census as single and living at 2015 DeMille Drive. (Cecil B. DeMille lived at 2000, the only other address on the street.)

Alcohol, dogs, children, and his red bulbous nose
Fields's screen character often expressed a fondness for alcohol, a prominent component of the Fields legend. During his early career as a juggler, Fields never drank at all because he wanted to remain sober while performing.  Eventually, the loneliness of constant travel prompted him to keep liquor in his dressing room as an inducement for fellow performers to socialize with him on the road. Only after he became a Follies star and abandoned juggling did Fields begin drinking regularly. His role in Paramount Pictures' International House (1933), as an aviator with an unquenchable taste for beer, did much to establish Fields's popular reputation as a prodigious drinker. Studio publicists promoted this image, as did Fields himself in press interviews.

Fields expressed his fondness for alcohol to Gloria Jean (playing his niece) in Never Give a Sucker an Even Break: "I was in love with a beautiful blonde once, dear. She drove me to drink. That's the one thing I am indebted to her for."  Equally memorable was a line in the 1940 film My Little Chickadee:  "Once, on a trek through Afghanistan, we lost our corkscrew... and were compelled to live on food and water for several days."  The oft-repeated anecdote that Fields refused to drink water "because fish fuck in it" is unsubstantiated.

On movie sets, Fields shot most of his scenes in varying states of inebriation.  During the filming of Tales of Manhattan (1942), he kept a vacuum flask with him at all times and frequently availed himself of its contents.  Phil Silvers, who had a minor supporting role in the scene featuring Fields, described in his memoir what happened next:

In a testimonial dinner for Fields in 1939, the humorist Leo Rosten remarked of the comedian that "any man who hates dogs and babies can't be all bad". The line—which Bartlett's Familiar Quotations later erroneously attributed to Fields himself—was widely quoted, and reinforced the popular perception that Fields hated children and dogs. In reality, Fields was somewhat indifferent to dogs, but occasionally owned one. He was fond of entertaining the children of friends who visited him, and doted on his first grandchild, Bill Fields III, born in 1943. He sent encouraging replies to all of the letters he received from boys who, inspired by his performance in The Old Fashioned Way, expressed an interest in juggling.

It was often thought that his red bulbous nose was a result of his drinking, but it is now believed that he suffered from the skin condition rosacea (leading to rhinophyma, which was sometimes referred to as a "whiskey nose", "gin blossom", "toros nose", and "potato nose").

Illness and career sideline 

In 1936, Fields's heavy drinking precipitated a significant decline in his health. He was chronically ill and suffering from pneumonia complicated by Paget's disease. By the following year he recovered sufficiently to make one last film for Paramount, The Big Broadcast of 1938. Fields tried to inject his own material into the scenes already written, but when Paramount issued an ultimatum to perform according to the shooting script, Fields refused and Paramount fired him. Fields was outraged by the dismissal: "When the picture is finished and my stuff proves to be the outstanding feature of the picture, what happens? I am given my congé and the director and the supervisor and the producer who are responsible for this $1,300,000 flop go calmly on their way, working for the studio making another picture. The star has flopped."

Physically unable to work in films, Fields was off the screen for more than a year. During his absence, he recorded a brief speech for a radio broadcast. His familiar snide drawl registered so well with listeners that he quickly became a popular guest on network radio shows. Although his radio work was not as demanding as motion-picture production, Fields insisted on his established movie-star salary of $5,000 per week. He joined ventriloquist Edgar Bergen and Bergen's dummy Charlie McCarthy on The Chase and Sanborn Hour for weekly insult-comedy routines.

Fields would twit Charlie about his being made of wood:

When Fields would refer to McCarthy as a "woodpecker's pin-up boy" or a "termite's flophouse," Charlie would fire back at Fields about his drinking:

Another exchange:

During his recovery from illness, Fields reconciled with his estranged wife and established a close relationship with his son after Claude's marriage in 1938.

Return to films
Fields's renewed popularity from his radio broadcasts with Bergen and McCarthy earned him a contract with Universal Pictures in 1939, brokered by promoter-producer Lester Cowan. The first feature for Universal, You Can't Cheat an Honest Man, carried on the Fields–McCarthy rivalry. It was originally announced as an Bergen-McCarthy starring vehicle, with Fields's name in much smaller type as a guest star.  Fields dominated the action and stole the film, winning star billing in the process.

In 1940 he co-starred with Mae West in My Little Chickadee, and then starred in The Bank Dick in which he has the following exchange with Shemp Howard, who plays a bartender:

Fields fought with studio producers, directors, and writers over the content of his films. He was determined to make a movie his way, with his own script and staging, and his choice of supporting players. Universal finally gave him the chance, and the resulting film, Never Give a Sucker an Even Break (1941), was an absurd satire of Hollywood moviemaking. Fields appeared as himself, characterized as "The Great Man." Advance publicity named the film The Great Man before Universal adopted the final title. Fields personally recruited Universal's then-popular singing star Gloria Jean and his old cronies Leon Errol and Franklin Pangborn as his co-stars. Director Eddie Cline filmed the rambling script as Fields conceived it, culminating in an incoherent string of blackout sketches. In an attempt to add structure to the film, Universal recut and reshot parts of the feature without Fields's participation. Both the film and Fields were released quietly in late 1941. Sucker was Fields's last starring film.

Final years
Fields fraternized at his home with actors, directors and writers who shared his fondness for good company and good liquor. John Barrymore, Gene Fowler, and Gregory La Cava were among his close friends. On March 15, 1941, while Fields was out of town, Christopher Quinn, the two-year-old son of his neighbors, actor Anthony Quinn and his wife Katherine DeMille, drowned in a lily pond on Fields's property.  Grief-stricken over the tragedy, he had the pond filled in.

Fields had a substantial library in his home. Although a staunch atheist—or perhaps because of it—he studied theology and collected books on the subject. According to a popular story (possibly apocryphal, according to biographer James Curtis), actor Thomas Mitchell caught Fields reading a Bible. Mitchell asked what he was doing, and Fields replied, "Looking for loopholes."

In a 1994 episode of the Biography television series, Fields's 1941 co-star Gloria Jean recalled her conversations with Fields at his home. She described him as kind and gentle in personal interactions, and believed he yearned for the family environment he never experienced as a child.

During the 1940 presidential campaign, Fields authored a book, Fields for President, with humorous essays in the form of a campaign speech. Dodd, Mead and Company published it in 1940, with illustrations by Otto Soglow. In 1971, when Fields was seen as an anti-establishment figure, Dodd, Mead issued a reprint, illustrated with photographs of the author.

Fields's film career slowed considerably in the 1940s. His illnesses confined him to brief guest film appearances. An extended sequence in 20th Century-Fox's Tales of Manhattan (1942) was cut from the original release of the film and later reinstated for some home video releases. The scene featured a temperance meeting with society people at the home of a wealthy society matron Margaret Dumont, in which Fields discovers that the punch has been spiked, resulting in drunken guests and a very happy Fields.

He enacted his billiard table routine for the final time for Follow the Boys, an all-star entertainment revue for the Armed Forces. (Despite the charitable nature of the movie, Fields was paid $15,000 for this appearance; he was never able to perform in person for the armed services.) In Song of the Open Road (1944), Fields juggled for a few moments and then remarked, "This used to be my racket." His last film, the musical revue Sensations of 1945, was released in late 1944. By then his vision and memory had deteriorated so much that he had to read his lines from large-print blackboards.

In 1944, Fields continued to make radio guest appearances, where script memorizations were unnecessary.  A notable guest slot was with Frank Sinatra on Sinatra's CBS radio program on February 9, 1944.

Fields's last radio appearance was on March 24, 1946, on the Edgar Bergen and Charlie McCarthy Show on NBC. Just before his death that year, Fields recorded a spoken-word album, including his "Temperance Lecture" and "The Day I Drank a Glass of Water", at Les Paul's studio, where Paul had installed a new multi-track recorder. The session was arranged by one of his radio writers, Bill Morrow, and was Fields's last performance.

Listening to one of Paul's experimental multi-track recordings, Fields remarked, "The music you're making sounds like an octopus. Like a guy with a million hands. I've never heard anything like it." Paul was amused, and named his new machine OCT, short for octopus.

Death
Fields spent the last 22 months of his life at the Las Encinas Sanatorium in Pasadena, California. In 1946, on Christmas Day—the holiday he said he despised—he had a massive gastric hemorrhage and died, aged 66. Carlotta Monti wrote that in his final moments, she used a garden hose to spray water onto the roof over his bedroom to simulate his favorite sound, falling rain. According to a 2004 documentary, he winked and smiled at a nurse, put a finger to his lips, and died. This poignant depiction is uncorroborated and "unlikely", according to biographer James Curtis.  Fields's funeral took place on January 2, 1947, in Glendale, California.

His cremation, as directed in his will, was delayed pending resolution of an objection filed by Hattie and Claude Fields on religious grounds. They also contested a clause leaving a portion of his estate to establish a "W. C. Fields College for Orphan White Boys and Girls, where no religion of any sort is to be preached". After a lengthy period of litigation, his remains were cremated on June 2, 1949, and his ashes interred at the Forest Lawn Memorial Park Cemetery in Glendale.

Gravestone

A popular bit of Fields folklore maintains that his grave marker is inscribed, "I'd rather be in Philadelphia"—or a close variant thereof. The legend originated from a mock epitaph written by Fields for a 1925 Vanity Fair article: "Here Lies / W. C. Fields / I Would Rather Be Living in Philadelphia".  In reality, his interment marker bears only his stage name and the years of his birth and death.

Comic persona and style
He often played a "bumbling hero". In 1937, in an article in Motion Picture magazine, Fields analyzed the characters he played:

You've heard the old legend that it's the little put-upon guy who gets the laughs, but I'm the most belligerent guy on the screen. I'm going to kill everybody. But, at the same time, I'm afraid of everybody—just a great big frightened bully . ... I was the first comic in world history, so they told me, to pick fights with children. I booted Baby LeRoy ... then, in another picture, I kicked a little dog . ... But I got sympathy both times. People didn't know what the unmanageable baby might do to get even, and they thought the dog might bite me.

In features such as It's a Gift and Man on the Flying Trapeze, he is reported to have written or improvised more or less all of his own dialogue and material, leaving story structure to other writers. He frequently incorporated his stage sketches into his films—e.g., the "Back Porch" scene he wrote for the Follies of 1925 was filmed in It's the Old Army Game (1926) and It's a Gift (1934); the golf sketch he performed in the lost film His Lordship's Dilemma (1915) was re-used in the Follies of 1918, and in the films So's Your Old Man (1926), The Golf Specialist (1930), The Dentist (1932), and You're Telling Me (1934).

Fields's most familiar characteristics included a distinctive drawl, which was not his normal speaking voice. His manner of muttering deprecatory asides was copied from his mother, who in Fields's childhood often mumbled sly comments about neighbors who passed by. He delighted in provoking the censors with double entendres and the near-profanities "Godfrey Daniels" and "mother of pearl". A favorite bit of "business", repeated in many of his films, involved his hat going astray—either caught on the end of his cane, or simply facing the wrong way—as he attempts to put it onto his head.

In several of his films, he played hustlers, carnival barkers, and card sharps, spinning yarns and distracting his marks. In others, he cast himself as a victim: a bumbling everyman husband and father whose family does not appreciate him.

Fields often reproduced elements of his own family life in his films. By the time he entered motion pictures, his relationship with his estranged wife had become acrimonious, and he believed she had turned their son Claude—whom he seldom saw—against him.  James Curtis says of Man on the Flying Trapeze that the "disapproving mother-in-law, Mrs. Neselrode, was clearly patterned after his wife, Hattie, and the unemployable mama's boy played by [Grady] Sutton was deliberately named Claude. Fields hadn't laid eyes on his family in nearly twenty years, and yet the painful memories lingered."

Unusual names
Although lacking formal education, Fields was well read and a lifelong admirer of author Charles Dickens, whose characters' unusual names inspired Fields to collect odd names he encountered in his travels, to be used for his characters.  Some examples are:
 "The Great McGonigle" (The Old-Fashioned Way);
 "Ambrose Wolfinger" [pointing toward "Wolf-whistling"] (Man on the Flying Trapeze);
 "Larson E. [read "Larceny"] Whipsnade", the surname taken from a dog track Fields had seen outside London (You Can't Cheat an Honest Man),
 "Egbert Sousé" [pronounced 'soo-ZAY', but pointing toward "souse", a synonym for a drunk] (The Bank Dick, 1940).

Fields often contributed to the scripts of his films under unusual pseudonyms. They include the seemingly prosaic "Charles Bogle", credited in four of his films in the 1930s; "Otis Criblecoblis", which contains an embedded homophone for "scribble"; and "Mahatma Kane Jeeves", a play on Mahatma and a phrase an aristocrat might use when about to leave the house: "My hat, my cane, Jeeves".

Supporting players
Fields had a small cadre of supporting players that he employed in several films:

 Elise Cavanna, whose onscreen interplay with Fields was compared (by William K. Everson) to that between Groucho Marx and his friend Margaret Dumont
 Jan Duggan, an old-maid character (actually only a year younger than Fields). It was of her character that Fields said in The Old Fashioned Way, "She's all dressed up like a well-kept grave."
 Kathleen Howard, as a nagging wife or antagonist
 Baby LeRoy, as a preschool child fond of playing pranks on Fields's characters
 Franklin Pangborn, a fussy, ubiquitous character comedian who played in several Fields films, most memorably as J. Pinkerton Snoopington in The Bank Dick
 Alison Skipworth, as his wife (although 16 years his senior), usually in a supportive role rather than the stereotypical nag
 Grady Sutton, typically a country bumpkin type, as a foil or an antagonist to Fields's character
 Bill Wolfe, as a gaunt-looking character, usually a Fields foil
 Tammany Young, as a dim-witted, unintentionally harmful assistant, who appeared in seven Fields films until his sudden death from heart failure in 1936

Unrealized film projects
W. C. Fields was (with Ed Wynn) one of the two original choices for the title role in the 1939 version of The Wizard of Oz. Fields was enthusiastic about the role, but ultimately withdrew his name from consideration so he could devote his time to writing You Can't Cheat an Honest Man.

Fields figured in an Orson Welles project. Welles's bosses at RKO Radio Pictures, after losing money on Citizen Kane, urged Welles to choose as his next film a subject with more commercial appeal. Welles considered an adaptation of Charles Dickens' The Pickwick Papers which would have starred Fields, but the project was shelved, partly because of contract difficulties, and Welles went on to adapt The Magnificent Ambersons.

During the early planning for his film It's a Wonderful Life, director Frank Capra considered Fields for the role of Uncle Billy, which eventually went to Thomas Mitchell.

Influence and legacy
A best-selling biography of Fields published three years after his death, W. C. Fields, His Follies and Fortunes by Robert Lewis Taylor, was instrumental in popularizing the idea that Fields's real-life character matched his screen persona. In 1973, the comedian's grandson, Ronald J. Fields, published the first book to challenge this idea significantly, W. C. Fields by Himself, His Intended Autobiography, a compilation of material from private scrapbooks and letters found in the home of Hattie Fields after her death in 1963.

According to Woody Allen (in a New York Times interview from January 30, 2000), Fields is one of six "genuine comic geniuses" he recognized as such in movie history, along with Charlie Chaplin, Buster Keaton, Groucho and Harpo Marx, and Peter Sellers.

The Surrealists loved Fields's absurdism and anarchistic pranks. Max Ernst painted a Project for a Monument to W. C. Fields (1957), and René Magritte made an Homage to Mack Sennett (1934).

Fields is one of the figures that appears in the crowd scene on the cover of The Beatles' 1967 album Sgt. Pepper's Lonely Hearts Club Band. The Firesign Theatre titled the second track of their 1968 album Waiting for the Electrician or Someone Like Him "W. C. Fields Forever", as a pun referring to the Beatles song "Strawberry Fields Forever".

The United States Postal Service issued a commemorative stamp on the comedian's 100th birthday, in January 1980.

There is a poster of Fields on the wall of Sam's bedroom on the TV show Freaks and Geeks.

Caricatures and imitations
 The character Horatio K. Boomer in the Fibber McGee and Molly radio show had a persona and delivery very much like the characters portrayed by Fields.
 Cartoonist Al Hirschfeld portrayed Fields in caricature many times, including the book cover illustrations for Drat!, A Flask of Fields, and Godfrey Daniels! – all edited by Richard J. Anobile.
 Fields is among the many celebrities caricatured in the 1936 Merrie Melodies short The Coo-Coo Nut Grove.
 Fields is seen sitting on the spectators' bench in the Disney cartoon Mickey's Polo Team (1936).
 He appears as W. C. Fieldmouse in the Merrie Melodies short The Woods Are Full of Cuckoos (1937).
 In the 1938 Silly Symphonies cartoon Mother Goose Goes Hollywood Fields is caricatured as Humpty Dumpty, in reference to his role in the live-action film Alice in Wonderland (1933).
 One episode of The Flintstones featured a tramp who gets old clothes belonging to Fred from his wife Wilma, then when Fred attempts to take back a coat, is trounced with the tramp's cane. The tramp has Fields's voice and persona.
 A 1960s Canadian cartoon series for kids Tales of the Wizard of Oz featured a Wizard with a voice imitation of Fields, a nod to the real-life choice of Fields to play the Wizard in the 1939 film classic opposite Judy Garland.
 The Firesign Theatre used Philip Proctor's voice impersonation of Fields for two characters on their albums Waiting for the Electrician or Someone Like Him and How Can You Be in Two Places at Once When You're Not Anywhere at All.
 The Wizard of Id comic strip contains a shady lawyer character, a Fields caricature named "Larsen E. Pettifogger".
 Paul Frees adapted a Fields comic routine for the animated TV special The Mad, Mad, Mad Comedians in 1970.
 In 1971 Frito-Lay replaced the Frito Bandito TV ad campaign with one featuring W. C. Fritos, a round, top-hat wearing character modeled on the movie persona of Fields. Also, circa 1970 Sunkist Growers produced a series of animated TV ads featuring the "Sunkist Monster", whose voice was an impression of Fields performed by Paul Frees.
 A caricature of Fields appears in the Lucky Luke comic book album Western Circus and again in the animated feature Lucky Luke: The Ballad of the Daltons.
 The TV show Gigglesnort Hotel featured a puppet character named "W. C. Cornfield" who resembled Fields in appearance and voice.
 Impressionist Rich Little often imitated Fields on his TV series The Kopycats, and he used a Fields characterization for the Ebenezer Scrooge character in his HBO special Rich Little's Christmas Carol (1978), a one-man presentation of A Christmas Carol.
 Derek Newark portrayed Fields in the 1983 Channel 4 television special Hollywood Hits Chiswick, in which Fields visits the site of his legendary performance at the Chiswick Empire.
 Actor Bob Leeman portrayed Fields in the 1991 movie The Rocketeer.
 In the second series of the TV drama Gangsters a character named the White Devil is introduced, who styles himself W.D. Fields, affecting the vocal mannerisms and appearance of Fields to confuse and confound his enemies. Played by series writer Philip Martin, he himself is credited in the final episode as "Larson E. Whipsnade" after Fields's character in You Can't Cheat an Honest Man.
 Canadian actor Andrew Chapman played Fields in a vaudeville-themed episode of "Murdoch Mysteries" in season 8, titled "The Keystone Constables".
 Comedian Mark Proksch impersonates Fields in a number of On Cinema episodes, beginning with the series' Second Annual Oscar Special and continuing through a majority of the seasons.

Filmography
Information for this filmography is derived from the book, W. C. Fields: A Life on Film, by Ronald J. Fields.  All films are feature length except where noted.

References

Further reading

Articles
 "The Man Who Juggles", The New York Star (December 19, 1908)
 "At the Ziegfeld Follies: Various Entertainers in the Big Show, as Seen by the THEATRE MAGAZINE'S Artist", Theatre Magazine (October 1921)
 "Funnyman W. C. Fields Has His Own Way of Keeping Himself Fit", Life (May 12, 1941), pp. 104–106, 109
 "W. C. Fields: The red-nosed, raspy-voiced funnyman, who never gave a sucker an even break, dies on Christmas Day", Life (January 6, 1947), pp. 63–64, 66
 Jan Kindler, "Elysian Fields", Playboy (March 1969)

Books

 W. C. Fields, Fields for President (1940, 1971) Dodd, Mead . (Humorous essays about Fields's stance on marriage, politics, finance, etc.)
 Robert Lewis Taylor, W. C. Fields: His Follies and Fortunes (1949) Doubleday & Co., (1967) New American Library . (First book biography, with many firsthand quotes from friends and colleagues)
 Gene Fowler, Minutes of the Last Meeting (1954) Viking Press
 Eddie Cantor, As I Remember Them (1963) Duell, Sloan & Pearce
 Donald Deschner (ed.), The Films of W. C. Fields (1966, 2000) Citadel Press
 Corey Ford, "The One and Only W. C. Fields" from The Time of Laughter (1967) Little, Brown
 William K. Everson, The Art of W. C. Fields (1967) Random House . (First book-length examination of the Fields films)
 Richard J. Anobile (ed.), Drat!: Being the Encapsulated View of Life by W. C. Fields in His Own Words (1968) World Publishing
 David Robinson, The Great Funnies: A History of Film Comedy (1969) E.P. Dutton
 Bosley Crowther, "W. C. Fields Comedy Festival" from New York Times Film Reviews, 1959–1968 (1970) Arno Press
 Andre Sennwald, capsule reviews from New York Times Film Reviews, 1932–1938 (1970) Arno Press
 Raymond Durgnat, "Suckers and Soaks" from The Crazy Mirror: Hollywood Comedy and the American Image (1970) Dell Publishing
 Andrew Bergman, "Some Anarcho-Nihilist Laff Riots" from We're in the Money: Depression America and Its Films (1971) New York University Press
 Otis Ferguson, "The Great McGonigle" from The Film Criticism of Otis Ferguson (1971) Temple University Press
 Carlotta Monti (with Cy Rice), W. C. Fields and Me (1971) Prentice-Hall, . (basis of the 1976 film starring Rod Steiger)
 Richard J, Anobile (ed.), A Flask of Fields: Verbal and Visual Gems from the Films of W. C. Fields (1972) W.W. Norton
 Leonard Maltin, Selected Short Subjects (first published as The Great Movie Shorts, 1972) Crown Publishers, (revised 1983) Da Capo Press
 Ronald J. Fields (ed.), W. C. Fields by Himself: His Intended Autobiography with Hitherto Unpublished Letters, Notes, Scripts and Articles (1973) Prentice-Hall .
 W. C. Fields (with Charles Grayson), The Bank Dick (1973) Simon & Schuster (the August 22, 1940 screenplay)
 W. C. Fields (with John T. Neville, et al.), Never Give a Sucker an Even Break (Rupert Hughes, et al.) Tillie and Gus (1973) Simon & Schuster (Continuity scripts derived from these films)
 Penelope Gilliatt, "To W. C. Fields, Dyspeptic Mumbler, Who Invented His Own Way Out" from Unholy Fools: Wits, Comics, Disturbers of the Peace (1973) Viking Press
 Gerald Mast, The Comic Mind: Comedy and the Movies (1973, 2nd ed. 1979) University of Chicago Press
 Donald W. McCaffrey, "The Latter-Day Falstaff" from The Golden Age of Sound Comedy (1973) A.S. Barnes
 Nicholas Yanni, W. C. Fields (1974) Pyramid Library
 Richard J. Anobile (ed.), Godfrey Daniels!: Verbal and Visual Gems from the Short Films of W. C. Fields (1975) Crown
 Walter Kerr, The Silent Clowns (1975) Alfred A. Knopf, (1990) Da Capo Press
 Stuart Byron and Elizabeth Weis (eds.), The National Society of Film Critics on Movie Comedy (1977) Grossman/Viking
 Leonard Maltin, The Great Movie Comedians (1978) Crown
 Will Fowler, The Second Handshake (1980) Lyle Stuart
 Louise Brooks, "The Other Face of W. C. Fields" from Lulu in Hollywood (1982) Alfred A. Knopf
 Ronald J. Fields, W. C. Fields: A Life on Film (1984) St. Martin's Press
 Wes D. Gehring, W. C. Fields: A Bio-Bibliography (1984) Greenwood Press
 Gerald Weales, Canned Goods as Caviar: American Film Comedy of the 1930s (1985) University of Chicago Press
 David T. Rocks, W. C. Fields: An Annotated Guide (1993) McFarland & Co.
 Wes D. Gehring, Groucho and W. C. Fields: Huckster Comedians (1994) University Press of Mississippi
 Simon Louvish, It's a Gift (1994) British Film Institute
 Simon Louvish, Man on the Flying Trapeze: The Life and Times of W. C. Fields (1999) Faber & Faber . (New biography with new research)
 Ronald J. Fields with Shaun O'L. Higgins, Never Give a Sucker an Even Break: W. C. Fields on Business (2000) Prentice-Hall
 James Curtis, W. C. Fields: A Biography (2003) Alfred A. Knopf . (The definitive, comprehensive biography, with many "apocryphal" stories from previous bios corrected)
 Scott MacGillivray and Jan MacGillivray, Gloria Jean: A Little Bit of Heaven (2005) iUniverse . (Authorized biography with recollections of Fields at work)
 Wes D. Gehring, Film Clowns of the Depression (2007) McFarland & Co.
 Gregory William Mank (et al.), Hollywood's Hellfire Club (2007) Feral House
 Arthur Frank Wertheim. W. C. Fields from Burlesque and Vaudeville to Broadway: Becoming a Comedian (Palgrave Macmillan, 2014). xxvi, 264 pp.
 James L. Neibaur, The W. C. Fields Films (2017) McFarland and Co.

External links

 
 
 
 Criterion Collection essay by Dennis Perrin on W. C. Fields: Six Short Films
 Bibliography
 W. C. Fields's first show for the Chase And Sanborn Hour 1937-05-09 (01) Guest – Ann Harding

 
1880 births
1946 deaths
20th-century American male actors
20th-century atheists
People from Darby, Pennsylvania
Male actors from New Rochelle, New York
Male actors from Philadelphia
Alcohol-related deaths in California
American male comedians
American male comedy actors
20th-century American comedians
American male radio actors
American male film actors
American male silent film actors
American people of English descent
Burials at Forest Lawn Memorial Park (Glendale)
Jugglers
Trick shot artists
Vaudeville performers
Paramount Pictures contract players
Ziegfeld Follies
Silent film comedians
20th-century pseudonymous writers
Universal Pictures contract players
Members of The Lambs Club
Blue Thumb Records artists